Chaman Bahaar is a 2020 Indian Hindi-language drama film written and directed by Apurva Dhar Badgaiyann. The film is produced by Yoodlee Films, a production venture of Saregama India. It stars Jitendra Kumar and Ritika Badiani. The movie revolves around a small town panwalla who falls in love with a schoolgirl who lives opposite his shop before even meeting her. Chaman Bahaar released on Netflix on 19 June 2020
and is set in the town of Lormi in Indian state Chhattisgarh.

Cast
Jitendra Kumar as Prem Kumar Yadav (Billu) 
Ritika Badiani as Rinku Nanoriya 
Bhuvan Arora as Somu 
Alam Khan as Shila Bhaiya 
Dhirendra Tiwari as Chotu 
Ashwani Kumar as Ashu 
Yashwant Anand Gupta as  Dinesh 
Mizan Khan as Vitesh 
Bhagwan Tiwari as Bhadauria
Shiv Dev Singh as  Baba 
Neeraj Uke as  Thakur 
Anil Sharma as  Engineer  
Kaushal Kumar Upadhyay as  Shopkeeper

Soundtrack 

The film's music was composed by with Anshuman Mukherjee and Anuj Garg with lyrics written by Apurva Dhar Badgaiyan and Amit Prathan.

References

External links
 
 Chaman Bahar on Yoodlee Films
 Chaman Bahaar on Hungama Digital Media Entertainment

2020 films
Indian direct-to-video films
2020 direct-to-video films
Films set in Chhattisgarh
Indian drama films
2020 drama films
2020s Hindi-language films
Hindi-language drama films